Robert Cook Murray (18 February 1870 – 28 April 1948) was a Scottish sport shooter who competed in the 1912 Summer Olympics.

In 1912 he won the gold medal with the British team in the team 50 metre small-bore rifle competition. In the 25 metre small-bore rifle event he finished fifth and in the 50 metre rifle, prone competition he finished sixth.

References

External links
profile

1870 births
1948 deaths
British male sport shooters
ISSF rifle shooters
Olympic shooters of Great Britain
Shooters at the 1912 Summer Olympics
Olympic gold medallists for Great Britain
Olympic medalists in shooting
Sportspeople from Edinburgh
Scottish Olympic medallists
Medalists at the 1912 Summer Olympics